Christopher John Hurford  (30 July 1931 – 15 November 2020) was a Labor member of the Australian House of Representatives seat of Adelaide from 1969 to 1987. He played a key role in the development of Australia's skills-oriented immigration policy, and founded the ALP Labor Unity faction in SA.

Early life
Hurford was born in Mhow, India, to an English father and Australian mother. In 1940, his mother took the children to Perth, Western Australia where Hurford attended school, before returning to India, then to England. In 1949, his whole family migrated to Western Australia as 'ten-pound poms', despite their Australian heritage. After studying at the London School of Economics, Hurford worked in accountancy. He entered federal parliament in 1969, representing the Division of Adelaide, South Australia. The seat had fallen to Liberal Andrew Jones during the massive Coalition landslide of 1966.  However, Jones' strong conservatism did not play well in this traditionally Labor seat, and Hurford retook the seat for Labor on a resounding 14.3 percent swing, turning it into a safe Labor seat in one election cycle, taking a majority of the first preferences.  He held Adelaide until his resignation in 1987.

Ministerial record

Hurford was Minister for Housing and Construction, outside Cabinet in the first Hawke Ministry from March 1983 to December 1984.  In the second Hawke Ministry, he was promoted to Cabinet as Minister for Immigration and Ethnic Affairs until February 1987, when he replaced Don Grimes as Minister for Community Services.

Hurford's period as Immigration Minister was notable for his unsuccessful attempt to have Sheikh Taj El-Din Hilaly deported. He also made an early, unsuccessful attempt to reduce ministerial discretions in the granting of immigration visas.

In July 1987, Hurford withdrew from the third Hawke ministry for personal reasons. He resigned from Parliament at the end of the year.

The resulting by-election in his seat of Adelaide saw his party lose the seat with voters expressing anger at the by-election, having believed that Hurford would serve them as their member of parliament for the full term.

Internal ALP role
Within the South Australian ALP, Hurford is arguably an important modernising figure. He led the creation of the Labor Unity faction, a group variously described as "right-wing", moderate or (after the ascension of the UK Blair Government) "Third Way". A Catholic, Hurford won support from the socially conservative leadership of the Shop Distributive and Allied Trades Union in forming the faction.

In the 1980s Hurford led the SA Labor Unity group in vigorously defending within the ALP the policy direction of the Hawke Government, a direction with which the larger Centre-Left and Left factions were uncomfortable. By the 1990s Labor Unity became a substantial counterweight to the other factions in SA.

Post political life
On resignation from Parliament at the end of 1987, Hurford became Australia's Consul-General in New York for four years.
In 1991 he was appointed as head of external relations at the University of South Australia.

Notes

Australian Labor Party members of the Parliament of Australia
Members of the Australian House of Representatives for Adelaide
Members of the Australian House of Representatives
Members of the Cabinet of Australia
1931 births
2020 deaths
20th-century Australian politicians
Consuls-General of Australia in New York
Government ministers of Australia
Officers of the Order of Australia
British emigrants to Australia
Indian emigrants to Australia